The flag and coat of arms of the Sovereign Military Order of Malta, or the Jerusalem flag, display a white cross on a red field (blazon gules a cross argent),  ultimately derived from the design worn by the Knights Hospitaller during the Crusades.

The flag represents the Sovereign Military Order of Malta as a sovereign institution. The state flag bears a Latin cross that extends to the edges of the flag. The Flag of the Order's Works represents its humanitarian and medical activities, and it bears a white Maltese cross on a red field.
Both flags together represent the Sovereign Military Order of Malta. Its constitution states: "The flag of the Order bears either the white latin cross on a red field or the white eight-pointed cross (cross of Malta) on a red field."

History

The banner of the Knights Hospitaller was introduced in 1130, on the order of Pope Innocent III, for disambiguation from the Templars who used the reversed colours. The "eight-pointed cross" is also said to originate in the 12th century, under Raymond du Puy (this was at first a cross fourchée or cross ancrée, and developed into the fully articulated Maltese cross only around or after 1500).

A papal bull of Alexander IV in 1259 made the white cross the design to be put on the mantling of the knights.  After that, the emblem was adopted as a general symbol for the Order.  
In the time after the Hospitallers moved to Cyprus in 1291, the banner of a white cross in a red field was flown from ships in their navy.

Flag variants
Today the flag flies from the SMOM's headquarters at Palazzo Malta in Rome and from other official residences and embassies.  Together with the flag of Malta, it is also flown from Fort St Angelo in Birgu, Malta.  It goes with the Grand Master and members of the Sovereign Council when they make official visits.

The Flag of the Order's Works, featuring a Maltese cross, is flown by the SMOM's Grand Priories, Subpriories, and National Associations.  
As a symbol of its humanitarian works, the Order flies it at its hospitals and medical facilities.   It is sometimes described as the "Grand Master's flag," but it is not used as a personal standard.

The Grand Master's personal flag is red with a white Maltese cross surrounded by the collar of the order and surmounted by a crown.  It flies over the SMOM's magistral seats when the Grand Master is present.

Coat of arms 

"The armorial bearings of the Order display a white latin cross on a red oval field, surrounded by a rosary, all superimposed on a white eight-pointed cross and displayed under a princely mantle surmounted by a crown" as defined in article 6 of the Constitutional Charter.

See also 

 Flag of Denmark 
 Flag of Savoy
 Flag of Switzerland
 Postage stamps and postal history of the Sovereign Military Order of Malta
 List of Grand Masters of the Knights Hospitaller

References

External links

1130 establishments
Sovereign Military Order of Malta
Flags of organizations
Sovereign Military Order of Malta
Coats of arms
Sovereign Military Order of Malta